Myriostephes is a genus of moths of the family Crambidae. The genus was erected by Edward Meyrick in 1884.

Species
Myriostephes asphycta (Turner, 1915)
Myriostephes crocobapta Turner, 1908
Myriostephes haplodes (Meyrick, 1887)
Myriostephes leucostictalis (Hampson, 1899)
Myriostephes matura Meyrick, 1884
Myriostephes rubriceps (Hampson, 1903)

References

Spilomelinae
Crambidae genera
Taxa named by Edward Meyrick